Martin Škrtel (born 15 December 1984) is a Slovak former professional footballer, a former player and captain of the Slovakia national team and Liverpool.

Škrtel previously played for FK AS Trenčín and Zenit Saint Petersburg, before joining Liverpool for £6.5 million in January 2008. After eight-and-a-half years with Liverpool, where he played 320 official games and scored 18 goals, he joined Fenerbahçe. He has won the Russian Premier League and the League Cup, as well as being named Slovak Footballer of the Year four times.

Škrtel made his international debut for Slovakia in 2004 and has earned a total of 104 caps, making him the third most capped player of his country at the time of his retirement in 2019, behind Marek Hamšík and Miroslav Karhan. He also retired as Slovakia's 10th best international scorer with 6 goals, sharing the spot with Július Šimon and Miroslav Stoch. He represented the country as they reached the last 16 at both the 2010 FIFA World Cup and UEFA Euro 2016.

Early life
Škrtel was born in Handlová. At the time of his birth, Handlová was in Czechoslovakia but today, the town exists in Slovakia.

Club career

FC Baník Prievidza and FK AS Trenčín
Škrtel started his professional career at local side FC Baník Prievidza and soon won a move to FK AS Trenčín, where he played 44 games and scored 8 goals for them between 2001 and 2004.

Zenit Saint Petersburg
Škrtel made his debut for Zenit Saint Petersburg in a Russian Cup match on 31 July 2004. He said that the presence of Slovak and Czech players helped him to adjust to his new team. He played 113 times and scored 5 goals for the club, winning the Russian Premier League title in the 2007 season.

Valencia, Tottenham Hotspur, Everton and Newcastle United were all reported to be interested in his services, but he ended up signing for Liverpool in the January 2008 transfer window.

Liverpool

2007–08 season

Škrtel joined Liverpool on 11 January 2008 on a four-and-a-half-year contract for a transfer fee of £6.5 million. On completion of the deal, then Liverpool manager Rafael Benítez said of Škrtel:

"He is aggressive, quick, is good in the air and I think he's a very good player for the future and also for the present. He is very competitive, but his mentality for me is very good". He made his league debut against Aston Villa, wearing the number 37 for Liverpool. Benítez also compared Škrtel to legendary Liverpool defender Jamie Carragher.

2008–09 season
Škrtel made a bright start to the 2008–09 season, starting in all but one Premier League match and displacing out of favour Daniel Agger to the bench. He put in a number of strong performances with defensive partner Jamie Carragher against many top teams, notably Manchester United, Everton and Marseille in the UEFA Champions League. On 5 October 2008, Škrtel suffered a serious knee injury after falling awkwardly when challenging Ched Evans late in a game against Manchester City which Liverpool went on to win 3–2. It was later confirmed that he had torn the posterior cruciate ligament in his right knee but did not require surgery and was "expected to be back before Christmas".

On 28 December 2008, Škrtel returned from injury as a late substitute in Liverpool's 5–1 away win at Newcastle. He was a regular starter for Liverpool during the second half of the season, as the team finished second in the Premier League with 86 points.

2009–10 season
On 21 November 2009, Škrtel scored his first goal for Liverpool in a 2–2 draw with Manchester City. On 26 February 2010, it was confirmed that he had broken his metatarsal in his right foot while playing in the 3–1 UEFA Europa League victory over Unirea Urziceni the previous day.
On 18 August 2010, Škrtel signed a two-year contract extension with Liverpool, committing his future to the club until 2014.

2010–11 season
During the 2010–11 season, Škrtel played every minute of every Premier League match. On 28 November, in a match against Tottenham Hotspur at White Hart Lane, Škrtel scored both his second career goal for the club and his first Premier League own goal as Liverpool lost 2–1. On his 26th birthday, he captained Liverpool in the Europa League against Utrecht.

In May 2011, Škrtel stated that he felt the 2010–11 season had been his best for the club to date.

2011–12 season

On 27 August 2011, Škrtel scored a headed goal for Liverpool against Bolton Wanderers in his first league appearance of the season from an unfamiliar right-back position. On 18 September, he was sent off in a 4–0 away defeat against Tottenham.

On 18 December, Škrtel scored Liverpool's second goal in a league match away to Aston Villa in a 2–0 win. His first goal of 2012 came in a FA Cup fifth round tie against Brighton & Hove Albion, opening the scoring within five minutes of kick-off with header from a corner kick. On 26 February 2012, Škrtel scored against Cardiff City in the 2012 Football League Cup Final. Liverpool won 3–2 on penalties after the match had ended in a 2–2 draw, giving Škrtel his first trophy as a Liverpool player.

At the midway point of the season, Liverpool had the best defensive record in the Premier League. Liverpool left back José Enrique described Škrtel and Daniel Agger as "the best defensive partnership in the Premier League".

On 10 April 2012, Škrtel captained Liverpool for the first time in the league, leading his club to a 3–2 win over Blackburn Rovers and playing a major part in the first goal with a long pass to Craig Bellamy, who subsequently squared for Maxi Rodríguez to make the score 1–0. On 5 May, he started for Liverpool in the 2–1 2012 FA Cup Final defeat to Chelsea.

Škrtel was named the Liverpool Player of the Year in May 2012.

2012–13 season
On 20 August 2012, Škrtel announced that he would commit his future to Liverpool by signing a new contract.

Škrtel's season got off to a bad start, giving away a penalty in a 3–0 loss to West Brom on 18 August 2012. A week later, he scored the club's first goal of the season in a 2–2 draw against Manchester City. Later in the match, his poorly executed backpass to Pepe Reina was intercepted by Carlos Tevez to equalise for Manchester City.

In January 2013, Škrtel was dropped from the Liverpool team after a poor performance in an FA Cup defeat to Oldham Athletic. After starting only four Premier League matches in the second half of the season, Škrtel called 2012–13 "one of the worst seasons in my career and certainly the worst during my time at Liverpool".

2013–14 season

In August 2013, it was reported that Liverpool had rejected a £10 million offer for Škrtel from Rafael Benítez's Napoli.

After missing the first two matches of the season, Škrtel helped Liverpool keep a clean sheet in 1–0 home win against Manchester United on 1 September. On 9 November, he scored his first goal of the season in a 4–0 win against Fulham. On 29 December, he gave Liverpool a third-minute lead against Chelsea in a 2–1 loss at Stamford Bridge.

On 8 February 2014, Škrtel scored twice in the first ten minutes against Arsenal, to help Liverpool to a 5–1 win. On 22 March, he scored another brace in a 6–3 win over Cardiff City. On 13 April, he scored Liverpool's second goal in a crucial 3–2 win over Manchester City at Anfield to reach seven goals in the 2013–14 Premier League season.

On 11 May, he scored a record fourth own-goal of the Premier League season in a 2–1 win against Newcastle United. Despite those four own goals, Škrtel scored some decisive goals for Liverpool in some matches. Since his return against Manchester United in the third game of the season, he played every minute for Liverpool in the Premier League.

2014–15 season
On 4 November Škrtel captained Liverpool in a Champions League match against Real Madrid at the Santiago Bernabéu Stadium as captain Steven Gerrard and his vice-captain Jordan Henderson were both on the bench; Liverpool lost 0–1. After a poor beginning to the season, manager Brendan Rodgers switched to a three-man defensive line in October, with Škrtel playing a crucial part. His pace, athleticism and ball-playing abilities were key in this formation.

On 21 December, in a league game at Anfield against Arsenal, Škrtel received a head wound from an accidental collision with Olivier Giroud; the treatment added nine minutes onto the end of the match, in which Škrtel headed a 97th-minute equaliser for a vital 2–2 draw. In a League Cup semi-final defeat to Chelsea on 27 January 2015, Škrtel was stamped on by Chelsea forward Diego Costa. Referee Michael Oliver did not penalise the incident, but Costa was retrospectively banned for three matches by The Football Association (FA).

On 8 March 2015 in a sixth round FA Cup match against Blackburn Rovers, Škrtel was substituted and then taken to hospital after a collision with Rudy Gestede. Later that month, Škrtel was given a three-match ban for violent conduct by the FA for a stamp on Manchester United goalkeeper David de Gea. He unsuccessfully appealed, claiming it to be unintentional.

2015–16 season
On 10 July 2015, Škrtel signed a new contract with Liverpool. On 23 September 2015, he played his 300th match for Liverpool in a League Cup penalty shootout win over Carlisle United. Škrtel scored his first goal of the season on 21 November 2015, scoring the fourth goal in a 4–1 win away at Manchester City with a thunderous volley from the edge of the box off of a corner. The goal came exactly six years after Škrtel had scored his first goal for Liverpool against the same opponents. On 6 December 2015, Škrtel joined his former defence partner Jamie Carragher in second position on the All Time Premier League Own Goals list by scoring his seventh in a match against Newcastle. On 20 December, Škrtel suffered a tear in his hamstring and tendon which kept him on the sideline for six weeks.

Fenerbahçe

On 14 July 2016, Škrtel signed for Turkish Süper Lig club Fenerbahçe for a reported fee of £5 million. In his first season with Fenerbahçe, Škrtel played 31 games in the league, scoring 2 goals. At the end of the season, it was rumoured that Škrtel might return to English football and Stoke City, Swansea City, as well as Newcastle United, who were returning to Premier League and were at the time coached by Rafael Benítez, who signed Škrtel from Zenit in 2008, were all mentioned as clubs hoping to sign Škrtel, although his manager Karol Csontó dismissed the transfer rumours saying that "Even if it was Chelsea, he (Škrtel) will certainly not return to England", adding that Škrtel was happy with his stay at Fenerbahçe.

During autumn 2018 and spring of 2019, Škrtel was linked to transfers to Barcelona, that he allegedly turned down on the basis of his potential position in the squad, as well as a lucrative offer of Al-Ahli Jeddah. Instead it was stated that he may join his national team teammate Juraj Kucka, prior to Škrtel's international retirement in February 2019, in Parma.

Atalanta
On 9 August 2019, Škrtel joined Serie A club Atalanta. His contract was terminated three weeks later by mutual consent. He was not able to adapt with new environment, conditions and training methods. In an interview a week later, Škrtel said that a player like him just did not fit the Atalanta system. On 17 September 2019, Atalanta president Antonio Percassi stated in an interview that Škrtel's wife, Barbora, could be one of the reasons of his departure. Percassi said that she did not really want to move to Bergamo.

İstanbul Başakşehir
On 2 September 2019, he returned to Turkey signing with İstanbul Başakşehir. He made 20 appearances and scored three goals in the 2019–20 Süper Lig winning campaign, which was the first top flight title in the club's history.

He reached an agreement to leave Başakşehir in January 2021, with less than six months remaining on his contract, after suffering an Achilles tendon rupture in the previous month.

Spartak Trnava
In August 2021, Skrtel returned to Slovakia after 17 years to play for Spartak Trnava.

On 26 February 2022, Škrtel appeared in his first derby between Spartak and Slovan Bratislava. The match at Tehelné pole concluded in a goal-less tie. Post-match Škrtel was insulted by one of the home fans and an amateur-side club official.

Later, on 1 March 2022, Škrtel broke the club record at Trnava becoming club's oldest goalscorer beating Igor Šemrinec of Košice in a Cup fixture at Košická futbalová aréna in a 1-2 victory for Spartak. He was the only scorer in club history aged over 37 - precisely 37 years, 2 months and 14 days, beating the previous record held by Karol Tibenský.

After professional career

In August 2022 he left Spartak to fulfil his promise and finish his career at his childhood club FK Hajskala Ráztočno playing a local league in Prievidza.

International career

Škrtel played international football for Slovakia youth teams, before making his debut in the senior squad in 2004. He was selected in Slovakia's squad for the 2010 FIFA World Cup, the country's first as an independent nation. He played a crucial part in the team's 3–2 win over reigning champions Italy as he played in every match of their World Cup campaign, which saw Slovakia reach the round-of-16, where they lost to the eventual runners-up, the Netherlands. Škrtel captained Slovakia through UEFA Euro 2016 qualifying which saw the Slovaks defeat defending champions Spain en route to qualifying for the final tournament in France, where they achieved the Round of 16, beating Russia and tying with England.

Škrtel is the third most frequently capped player in the history of Slovakia and on 13 October 2018 he collected his 100th cap in the national team, becoming the third player in Slovak history to do so, in a derby match against Czech Republic in Trnava, in the same match, when Marek Hamšík became the most capped player in Slovakian history.

On 22 February 2019, Škrtel announced his retirement from international football at the age of 34, along with another national team defender Tomáš Hubočan and forward Adam Nemec. The trio shared a farewell game on 13 October 2019 in a friendly against Paraguay, which coincided with a national team return to Tehelné pole, after 10 years. Škrtel played in the starting XI as a captain and was substituted by Denis Vavro after some 30 minutes. Vavro is known for naming Škrtel as one of his footballing idols. Slovakia tied the game 1–1.

Style of play

Škrtel is known as a strong centre-back with significant aerial ability. Lucas Leiva has stated that he “is really strong and he gives the midfield confidence” owing to his quality. Sami Hyypia expressed his belief that Škrtel had quickly shown that he was “very athletic” and that he could “play the ball”. In 2013, Škrtel was voted No. 59 on Liverpool fan poll ‘100 Players who Shook the Kop’.

Career statistics

Club

International

Slovakia score listed first, score column indicates score after each Škrtel goal

Honours
Zenit Saint Petersburg
Russian Premier League: 2007

Liverpool
Football League Cup: 2011–12
FA Cup runner-up: 2011-12

İstanbul Başakşehir
Süper Lig: 2019–20

Spartak Trnava
Slovak Cup: 2021–22

Slovakia
King's Cup: 2018

Individual
Peter Dubovský Award: 2005
Slovak Footballer of the Year: 2007, 2008, 2011, 2012
Liverpool Player of the Year: 2011–12
Süper Lig Team of the Year: 2017–18
Slovak Super Liga Team of the Year: 2021–22

See also
List of men's footballers with 100 or more international caps

References

External links

Official website

1984 births
Living people
People from Handlová
Sportspeople from the Trenčín Region
Slovak footballers
Slovakia international footballers
Association football defenders
AS Trenčín players
FC Zenit Saint Petersburg players
Liverpool F.C. players
Fenerbahçe S.K. footballers
Atalanta B.C. players
İstanbul Başakşehir F.K. players
FC Spartak Trnava players
Slovak Super Liga players
Russian Premier League players
Premier League players
Süper Lig players
FA Cup Final players
2010 FIFA World Cup players
UEFA Euro 2016 players
FIFA Century Club
Slovak expatriate footballers
Expatriate footballers in England
Expatriate footballers in Italy
Expatriate footballers in Russia
Expatriate footballers in Turkey
Slovak expatriate sportspeople in England
Slovak expatriate sportspeople in Italy
Slovak expatriate sportspeople in Russia
Slovak expatriate sportspeople in Turkey